The Chevrolet S-10 is a compact pickup truck that was produced by Chevrolet. It was the first domestically built compact pickup of the big three American automakers. When it was first introduced as a  "quarter-ton pickup" in 1981 for the 1982 model year, the GMC version was known as the S-15 and later renamed the GMC Sonoma. A high-performance version was released in 1991 and given the name of GMC Syclone. The pickup was also sold by Isuzu as the Hombre from 1996 through 2000, but only in North America. There was also an SUV version, the Chevrolet S-10 Blazer/GMC S-15 Jimmy. An electric version was leased as a fleet vehicle in 1997 and 1998. Together, these pickups are often referred to as the S-series.

In North America, the S-series was replaced by the Chevrolet Colorado, GMC Canyon, and Isuzu i-Series in 2004.

The S-Series ended production in Brazil in 2012, being replaced by the Chevrolet Colorado, but still with the name S-10.

First generation (1982)

The first compact truck from the Big Three automakers was the rebadged Isuzu KB sold since 1972 as the Chevrolet LUV, and Ford quickly responded with the Mazda-built Ford Courier the same year. However, the 1973 Arab oil embargo forced GM to consider designing a domestically produced compact pickup truck. As usual, parts from other GM chassis lines (primarily from the GM G-body intermediates) were incorporated. Track width was similar to the former GM H-body subcompacts (Vega/Monza). The first S-series pickups were introduced in 1981 for the 1982 model year. The base engine (manufactured in Japan and imported) was a 1.9 L Isuzu four-cylinder (RPO LR1) shared with the LUV and Isuzu P'up, with a 2.8 L V6 as an option. The Chevrolet and GMC models were identical apart from the grille, tailgate and assorted insignia. For 1983, an extended cab, called "Maxi-Cab" on Chevrolet models and "Club Coupe" on GMCs, and "Insta-Trac" four-wheel drive were added, along with two new engines: a 2.0 L four-cylinder engine (RPO LQ2) from the J-platform automobiles along with an Isuzu 2.2 L (RPO LQ7) four-cylinder diesel engine.

The sport utility S-10 Blazer and S-15 Jimmy debuted for 1983; GM was the first to introduce the compact sport utility, followed by Ford and then Jeep the following year. Following the popularity of the Jeep Cherokee, 4-door SUV variants were introduced in March 1990 as 1991 models alongside the badge-engineered Oldsmobile Bravada.

New heavy-duty and off-road suspensions appeared in 1984 along with a hydraulic clutch, while the big news for 1985 was the discontinuation of the Cavalier's 2.0 L OHV I4 in favor of Pontiac's 2.5 L "Iron Duke" OHV I4. The OHV-derived 2.2 L diesel engine and 1.9 L SOHC gas engine, both from Isuzu, were gone the next year, leaving just the Iron Duke and updated 2.8 L V6. A much-welcomed 4.3 L V6 was added for 1988, and anti-lock brakes came the next year.
 
The GMC S-15 became the GMC Sonoma in 1991, and the Sierra trim packages were dropped to avoid confusion with the new GMC Sierra full-size pickup. The GMC Syclone also appeared that year. The Sonoma GT bowed in 1992. Added to this was the 4.3 L V6 Vortec W-code engine. This generation's last year was 1993.

Appearance packages
The S-10 Baja was an optional appearance package that was put on any four-wheel drive S-10 (regular-cab with short-box, regular-cab with long box and extended-cab with short box) from 1989 to 1991. The Baja was available in three colors: Midnight Black, Apple Red and Frost White. The Baja option also included a roll bar with off-road lights, front tubular grille guard with fog lights, tubular rear bumper, an underbody shield package (transfer case shield, front differential shield, fuel tank shield, oil pan/steering linkage shields), a suspension package, Chevrolet windshield banner, Baja decals on the box sides, and one inch wide body striping. Extra-cost Baja options included a cargo-net end-gate, aluminum "Outlaw" wheels, and a special box-mounted spare tire carrier with aluminum wheel. 1991 S-10 Bajas came with special "BAJA" embroidered red and gray bucket seats and unique red door panel trim.

The S-10 Cameo and Cameo EL were appearance packages available for the two-wheel drive S-10 between 1989 and 1991. When first introduced in 1989, the Cameo had three color choices; Apple Red, Frost White or Midnight Black. In 1991, two-tone paint schemes were available, as well as additional exterior features such as a wraparound front bumper with fog lamps, lower body ground-effects moldings and wheel flares, a flush-fitting tailgate valance, rear roll pan (state laws permitting), and "Cameo" lettering on the doors and tailgate. Other appearance packages included the S-10 Back Country, predecessor to the Baja, the S-10 Top Gun edition, the GMC Sonoma SST, the GMC S-15 Gypsy Magic and GMC Jimmy Magic.

Sonoma GT
Debuting in 1992, the GMC Sonoma GT was a performance package available on the two-wheel drive regular cab short bed Sonoma and was offered as an alternative lower priced version of its predecessor, the 1991 Syclone. The Sonoma GT was powered by an enhanced Vortec non turbocharged 4.3L L35 V6. It was equipped with a 4L60 automatic transmission and a limited-slip differential with 3.42:1 gearing. Because the Sonoma GT wasn't built as a track oriented speed demon like the Syclone, it still retained its payload capacity and towing ratings meaning that the owner could still use it like a pickup truck if they so desired.

Modified by Production Automotive Services of Troy, Michigan, the Sonoma GT featured a unique “Syclone inspired” cladding kit. While sharing the same front and rear bumper as the Syclone (and future 92-93 GMC Typhoon), the aero package did not have as much of an aggressive look as the Syclone but still featured bumperettes, lower door skirts, and rear quarter bed corners to round out the cladding package. GMC also decided to follow through with the Syclone theme into the interior which featured the same black and red piping door inserts and bucket seats – sans any headrest logo (the Syclone featured embroidered headrest logos), along with the same center console and shifter as seen in the Syclone. The gauge cluster was also the same setup, however due to the non turbo-charged powerplant of the Sonoma GT, the boost gauge is not included in the RPM cluster. The Sonoma GT's production only lasted for 1992.

Only 806 Sonoma GTs were ever produced, in a variety of colors such as the standard monochromatic black, apple red, white, aspen blue, teal, and forest green.

Sonoma GT color breakdown;
 1991 Black w/ Black (1 Total)
 Black w/ Black (406 Total)
 Black w/ Gray (30 Total)
 Frost White w/ Gray (107 Total)
 Apple Red w/ Gray (179 Total)
 Bright Teal w/ Gray (54 Total)
 Forest Green Metallic w/ Gray (15 Total)
 Aspen Blue w/ Gray (15 Total)

1993 Sonoma
Some 1992 and 1993 Sonomas came with a factory equipped L35 W-code engine.  For 1993 no specialty labeling or limited edition tags were known to be used with the W-code engine. Production totals for these vehicles are unknown.

1991 Syclone

The Syclone was a high performance package for the 1991 model year. It came with all-wheel drive, 4-wheel anti-lock brakes, a 4.3-litre LB4 V6 with lower compression pistons, a turbocharger and water intercooler system, They produced ~280 hp. Production was limited to just 2998 units.

Engines

Second generation (1994)

The second-generation trucks arrived for the 1994 model year. All of the special models (the Syclone, Typhoon, and Sonoma GT) were discontinued, but the changes to the pickup brought it in line with its major competitor the Ford Ranger. The Iron Duke 4-cylinder and 2.8 L 60° V6 engines were retired, the 4.3 L Vortec V6 was enhanced, and a new 2.2 L 4-cylinder engine (which had been introduced in 1990 on various front-wheel drive GM compact and mid-size platforms) became the engines of choice to power the second generation of S-10s. In compliance with the Clean Air Act, all second generation S-10s and Sonomas equipped with air conditioning used CFC-free R134a refrigerant beginning in the 1994 model year. The all new 1994 S-10 didn't offer any airbag, presumably as a temporary measure to economize the introduction of the new body styles, as well as to gradually phase out steering wheel designs that didn't accommodate for airbags, though the vehicle itself was slated for airbag capability.

Many of the chassis components were the same as the first generation (the control arms between the first and second generation were the same, originally sourced from GM's G-body platform), along with the steering knuckle, leaf springs, and differential assembly but suspension and axles were greatly enhanced. Lower control arms for the two-wheel drive model had 1/4-inch thicker steering stops - the second generation control arms are commonly used as an upgrade for the first generation. Sport utility models (Blazer, Jimmy, Bravada) came with thicker front and rear sway bars.

Generally, for the two-wheel drive trucks, the 8.5-inch rear end was only used when it came with both a manual transmission and the L35 W-code  V6 engine; it was an option for four-wheel drive trucks with either transmission. This was also the year that GM introduced the ZR2 off-road package.

For 1995, a driver's side airbag was added as well as daytime running lights. In 1996 the 4.3 L engine was refreshed, and a third (rear) door was added for extended cab models, along with the sportside bed option. In 1998, the exterior, interior, brakes, and 2.2 L I4 engine were refreshed, along with a "next-generation" supplemental restraint system that added a passenger-side air bag. The SS package was replaced by the "Xtreme" package. In 2001, a crew cab option was added and was only available with four-wheel drive and an automatic transmission. For the 2004 model year, the regular and extended cab models were discontinued; only the crew cab model was retained.

Base two-wheel drive models came with 15 x 6.5-inch wheels with directional vents, Xtreme and ZQ8 models came with 16 x 8-inch wheels while four-wheel drive models (including the ZR2) used 15 x 7-inch wheels. The  wheels used on the first generation were discontinued.

Electric versions

Solectria Corporation offered the E-10, which was an electric vehicle conversion of the S-10 starting in 1993. U.S. Electricar also offered S-10 conversions starting in 1994. In 1997, General Motors introduced the Chevrolet S-10 EV, a battery-electric version of the S-10 pickup. The S-10 EV used the same front-wheel drive powertrain as the GM EV1.

1998 Restyling

For 1998, the Chevrolet S-10, GMC Sonoma, and Isuzu Hombre received a mid-cycle refresh. On the exterior, the front fascia was redesigned, and new wheel designs were added. The interior received a full redesign, with "TheftLock" anti-theft functionality for most radios, improved audio systems (including newly designed radios), new interior front door panels, an optional combination cassette and CD player radio, redesigned keyless entry remotes, a new steering wheel, dual airbags, a new instrument cluster with digital odometer and gear shift indicator for automatic transmission-equipped models, and new seat fabrics.

Crew Cab (2001-2004)

In 2001, a four-door Crew Cab configuration was introduced for the Chevrolet S-10 and GMC Sonoma. Available exclusively in LS or SLS trims, the Crew Cab included many features that were optional on other S-10 models, such as full power accessories (windows, door locks, exterior side mirrors, and keyless entry), dual front bucket seats, fifteen-inch (15"), five-spoke aluminum-alloy wheels, an A/M-F/M stereo radio with TheftLock capabilities, a single-disc CD player, and Automatic Tone Control (ATC), a six-speaker audio system, a tachometer for the instrument cluster, and air conditioning. Leather-trimmed seating surfaces were also introduced for the Crew Cab for the first time for the 2001 model year.

ZR-5 Sport Package 
Available exclusively on the Chevrolet S-10 and GMC Sonoma LS and SLS Crew Cab models, the ZR-5 Sport Package was a sport appearance package that added black front and rear bumpers, fifteen-inch (15") machined aluminum-alloy wheels, "ZR-5" pickup side box decals to the standard S-10 and Sonoma LS and SLS Crew Cab models.

SS
The Chevrolet S-10 SS was a high-performance version of the S-10, introduced in 1994.  Fewer than 3,000 SSs were produced yearly on average. When introduced, the SS was only sold in three colors: Onyx Black, Summit White, and Apple Red. The SS was discontinued in 1998 and was replaced by the S-10 Xtreme for the 1999 model year.

The SS included a limited slip differential, lowered suspension (starting with the 1996 model year), cosmetic changes such as a different grille, body-colored bumpers, 16-inch wheels (available from 1996 to 1998, similar in design to the 1991 and 1992 Camaro Z28 with Chevrolet "bowtie" logo center caps), and other minor cosmetic differences. All SS versions were regular cabs, Xtremes were available with the "third door" extended cab. A step-side version was available from 1996 to 1998 and until 2003 on the Xtreme.

ZR2
The ZR2 package was an off-road package available for the second generation S-10. The ZR2 package included a  wider track width, a boxed ladder-type frame with modified suspension mounting points, larger wheel and axle bearings, 31-inch all-terrain tires, a suspension lift (approximately 3 inches more ground clearance versus a regular four-wheel drive S-10), upgraded Bilstein suspension, fender flares, alloy wheels, and an 8.5-inch Chevrolet 10-bolt rear differential with 3.73:1 gears and an Eaton MLocker (coded as G80).

Isuzu Hombre

In 1996, Isuzu replaced its P'up with a version of the Louisiana-built Chevrolet S-10, the Isuzu Hombre, based on the Brazilian market S-10 (the front grille and fenders are based on the Brazilian S-10 along with the truck bed sheetmetal). The Hombre differed from its GM siblings mostly in the front sheetmetal, with different lights, grille, front bumper and front fenders, which were more flared out. The rear quarter panels were also different, as they had a slight flare over the wheel well to match the front fenders. The Hombre had a much smaller range of equipment options compared to the S-10 and Sonoma; a Spacecab extended cab, V6 engine and four-wheel drive were added for 1997 and available until 1998.

Two trim levels were offered: the base S and the uplevel XS. The XS had features like a cassette tape deck, higher-grade interior fabric, a tachometer, sliding rear window, and a split 60/40 seatback. Hombres were equipped with the Chevrolet S-series 15 x 7 steel wheels (with 8 directional vents) - the Hombre wheels were painted black (the S10, Sonoma, and Blazer/Jimmy wheels were painted silver) since a majority were equipped with wheel covers with the Isuzu logo. Hombres were also available with the S-10's aluminum wheels with Isuzu center caps.

Slow sales resulted in production ending in 2000. It would be another six years before Isuzu re-entered the pick-up market with the i-Series, which formed the basis for the S-10's successor, the Colorado.

South America and China (1994-2012)

Engines

Third generation (2012)

Although the North American version of the S-series was discontinued in 2004, the second generation S-10 was still being built in Brazil until 2012, when it was replaced by a Brazilian-built version of the Chevrolet Colorado called the S-10.

In Brazil, until 2014, the third generation S-10 offered a 2.4 L 147 hp Flexpower flex-fuel engine or a 2.8 L 180 hp Duramax diesel engine. For 2015 models, the diesel engine was refreshed, resulting in an increased power output of 200 hp. The flex-fuel (gasoline/ethanol) engine had an upgrade for some versions (LT and LTZ) and offered 206 hp with a 2.5 L LCV Ecotec with direct fuel injection. Also, for the first time in Brazil, Chevrolet offered the flex-fuel S-10 with four-wheel drive.

For the 2017 model, the S-10 received a facelift and the flex-fuel 2.4 L engine was dropped, with the remaining engine choices being unchanged. For 2018, the flex-fuel S-10 offers an automatic transmission, currently the market trend on these vehicles in Brazil. Since 2021, the Holden S-10 received a face lift in Warren, but as Holden was closed in Australia, the Tooling was transferred to Brazil. Then in Brazil had a third face lift, when Colorado of USA also received another face lift for 2023.

A right-hand-drive version of the 2017+ facelifted model was built at the GM Thailand plant and sold in Australia and New Zealand as Holden Colorado until 2020.

S10 Max (2021) 

In late 2021, General Motors introduced the S10 Max for the Mexican market and several other Latin American countries. Imported in China and produced by SAIC, it is a rebadged Maxus T70.

References

External links

  (Brazil)
 Syclone Typhoon & Sonoma GT News & Information

S-10
Flexible-fuel vehicles
Pickup trucks
Rear-wheel-drive vehicles
All-wheel-drive vehicles
1980s cars
1990s cars
2000s cars
Cars of Brazil
Cars introduced in 1981
Motor vehicles manufactured in the United States